Kelarestaq may refer to:
 Kelarestaq-e Gharbi Rural District
 Kelarestaq-e Sharqi Rural District